The 22497 / 22498 Sri Ganganagar – Tiruchchirapali Humsafar Express is a superfast express train of the Indian Railways connecting Sri Ganganagar to Tiruchirappalli, providing connectivity to Rajasthan from Central Tamil Nadu. It is the 4th Humsafar Express train which is introduced in the Humsafar Express Series. It is currently being operated with the train numbers 22497/22498 on a weekly basis. During the COVID-19 Pandemic, it ran as a special service which is numbered as 02497/02498.

Coach Composition 

The train is completely a 3-tier AC sleeper train designed by Indian Railways with features of LED screen display to show information about stations, train speed etc. and will have announcement system as well, Vending machines for tea, coffee and milk, Bio toilets in compartments as well as CCTV cameras.

The train has standard LHB rakes with max speed of 130 kmph. The train consists of 19 coaches :

 16 AC III Tier
 1 Pantry Car
 2 End-on Generator

Service

It averages 53 km/hr as 22497/Sri Ganganagar - Tiruchchirappalli Humsafar Express starts on Tuesday and covering 3116 km in 58h 25m & 54 km/hr as 22498/Tiruchchirapalli - Sriganganagar HumSafar Express starts on Thursday covering 3114 km in 57h 55m. The rakes have primary maintenance at Sri Ganganagar and the rakes also have secondary maintenance at Tiruchirappalli.

Timings

22497 - leaves Shri Ganganagar Jn every Tuesday at 2:00 PM and reach Tiruchchirappalli Junction on Thursday at 11:20 AM IST

22498 - Leaves Tiruchchirappalli Junction Every Friday and reach Shri Ganganagar Jn on Sunday at afternoon 13:40 PM IST

Route & Halts

Traction 

As the route is partly electrified, it is hauled by three locomotives. From Shri Ganganagar till Ahmedabad Junction, it gets hauled by a WDP 4 / WDP 4D diesel locomotive from Bhagat Ki Kothi diesel shed. From Ahmedabad Junction till Pune, it is hauled by a Vadodara based WAP 5 / WAP 7 electric locomotive. From Pune till Tiruchirappalli Junction railway station, it is hauled by a Pune based WDP 4D diesel locomotive.

Direction Reversal

Train Reverses its direction 1 times:

Future Plans and Proposals 
Inorder to generate more revenue and to serve more people, This train service is planed to extend till Madurai Junction from Tiruchirappalli via Dindigul.

See also 

 Humsafar Express
 Tiruchirappalli Junction railway station
 Shri Ganganagar Junction railway station

Notes

References

External links 
14715/Sri Ganganagar - Tiruchchirappalli HumSafar Express
14716/Tiruchchirapalli - Sriganganagar HumSafar Express

Transport in Sri Ganganagar
Rail transport in Tiruchirappalli
Railway services introduced in 2017
Humsafar Express trains
Rail transport in Rajasthan
Rail transport in Gujarat
Rail transport in Maharashtra
Rail transport in Karnataka
Rail transport in Tamil Nadu